I Remember You Now... is a 2005 short film written by William Borden, directed by Henry S Miller and produced by Michael G. Gunther, in which Deborah Harry and Gary Ray Bugarcic play two old classmates attending their 20-year high school reunion.

External links

2005 films
American short films
2000s English-language films